The 2022–23 Auburn Tigers women's basketball will represent Auburn University in the 2022–23 college basketball season. Led by second year head coach Johnnie Harris, the team will play their games at Neville Arena and are members of the Southeastern Conference.

Schedule and results

|-
!colspan=12 style=|Exhibition
|-

|-
!colspan=12 style=|Non-conference regular season

|-
!colspan=12 style=|SEC regular season

|-
!colspan=9 style=| SEC Tournament

|-
!colspan=9 style=| WNIT

See also
 2022–23 Auburn Tigers men's basketball team

References

Auburn Tigers women's basketball seasons
Auburn Tigers
Auburn Tigers women's basketball
Auburn Tigers women's basketball